Arnison is a surname. Notable people with the surname include:

Billy Arnison (1924–1996), South African footballer
Charles Arnison (1893–1974), British WWI flying ace
John Arnison, British music manager and producer
Paul Arnison (born 1977), British footballer
Peter Arnison (born 1940), Australian politician